The TK 95 microcomputer was a 1986 ZX Spectrum clone by Microdigital Eletrônica, a company located at São Paulo, Brazil. It was an evolution of the TK90X introduced the previous year. 

The case was redesigned (copied from the Commodore Plus/4) and the keyboard was said to be "semi-professional" (according to the Brazilian manufacturer), with the some additional Sinclair BASIC commands that did not exist in the ZX Spectrums (for user defined charactersUDG), and better compatibility with the original ZX Spectrum (compared to the TK90X).

Like the Spectrum, the machine had 48 kilobytes of RAM. Inside, the same processor: Z80A running at 3.58 MHz, a 16 KB ROM chip and some RAM chips (old dynamic rams 4116 and 4416). Microdigital did some reverse engineering to develop a chip with the functions of the original ULA from Sinclair/Ferranti. The modulator was tuned to VHF channel 3 and the TV system was PAL-M (60 Hz). The cassette interface ran at a faster speed than the Spectrum. 

Only two peripherals were released by Microdigital a light pen interface and a parallel printer interface. Other companies in Brazil released clone versions of Interface 1 joysticks (Atari 2600-compatibles) and interfaces for 5¼" PC drives (360 KB). The games had questionable legality being close to copies of the originals and the fans of the ZX Spectrum computer in Brazil were counted in tens of thousands.

References

External links 

 – Clube do TK90X
 TK95 in Old-Computers
 ZEsarUX – ZX Second-Emulator And Released for UniX (GPL)

Microdigital Eletrônica 
Computer-related introductions in 1986
Goods manufactured in Brazil
Products introduced in 1986
ZX Spectrum clones